Castle is the sixth studio album by Taiwanese singer Jolin Tsai. It was released on February 27, 2004, by Sony. Produced by Bing Wang, Peter Lee, Jay Chou, Jamie Hsueh, Huang Yi, and G-Power, it incorporated genres of pop, hip-hop, Latin, chanson, heavy metal, and Britpop. It was well received by music critics, who commented that it consolidated Tsai's successful development trend in the Chinese music scene.

The album sold more than 1.5 million copies in Asia. In Taiwan, it topped the album sales chart for nine consecutive weeks and sold more than 300,000 copies, becoming the year's highest-selling album by a female artist and the year's second highest-selling album overall. Tsai embarked on her first concert tour J1 World Tour after the release of the album, which started on August 7, 2004 in Shanghai, China and ended on April 22, 2006 in Irvine, United States.

Background and development 
On March 7, 2003, Tsai released her fifth studio album, Magic. It sold more than 1.5 million copies in Asia. In Taiwan, it sold more than 360,000 copies, becoming the year's highest-selling album by a female artist and the year's second highest-selling album overall. It was nominated a Golden Melody Award for Album of the Year, Tsai was nominated for Best Female Mandarin Singer, and Baby Chung was nominated for Best Music Arrangement for "Prague Square". Eventually, Baby Chung won Best Music Arrangement.

On November 13, 2003, it was revealed that Tsai would start recording her new album in the month, which would be released in January 2004, and it was revealed that she would start preparing for her first concert tour in March 2004, Tsai said: "Now I have started working out for the concert, I must be at my best to stand on the world stage!" On December 14, 2003, it was revealed that she postponed the release of the album to February 2004, because she wanted to re-record songs from the album. On January 9, 2004, it was revealed that the album would include songs written by Jay Chou. On February 10, 2004, it was revealed that the album would be released on February 27, 2004.

Writing and recording 

"Pirates" incorporated elements of hip-hop, flamenco, and medieval music , and Jay Chou provided the rap harmony in the song. The lyrics of "36 Tricks of Love" describe the active view of love of independent modern women, "It's like falling in love with a tall, handsome man but not having the courage to approach him, in fact, there are always opportunities. If a girl can put down her shyness and talk to men more and make phone calls, love may come," Tsai said. Both "36 Tricks of Love" and "First Priority" integrated dance-pop with heavy metal instruments, such as electric guitar and bass, the sharp crackling timbre provides an interesting contrast to Tsai's sweet vocals and enhanced the strength of the song. "It's Love" is a sweet song with a relaxing rhythm. "The Smell of Lemon Grass" shows Tsai's richer vocal performance and more stable emotional control than before. 

"Love Love Love" is the Mandarin version of Nu Virgos' "Stop! Stop! Stop!", it is a romantic song with a strong southern European sentiment, the bright rhythm with her sweet vocals gave the audience a happy touch. "The Starter" is a sad, breathless lyrical song, and her singing at the beginning is very touching. The lyrics were written by Tsai, and she said they reflect her personal view of love: "There is no third party in love. I hope people in love do not blame each other after broke-up. There is no right or wrong in love." "Nice Cat" is the Chinese version of Chana's "Stupid", and it is a mix of Latin and hip-hop, Tsai also used a cool but sweet voice in the song, where she also cleverly mimicked the sound of cat, she said: "'Nice Cat' is a very playful song and has the line 'I'm not your cat' and I thought it would be funnier with a 'meow'." The lyrics of "Disappearing Castle" describe the sad realization of the bitter taste of reality after the collapse of love. "Rewind" was Tsai's first attempt of Britpop style.

Title and artwork 
Sony spent a total of NT$3 million to ask Japanese designers Yuichi Miyashi and Hiroyasu Watanabe to create visual arts for the album, Miyashi also designed the logo for the album, inspired by Tsai's gorgeous moves, the letter "J" was designed in the shape of a flying bird.

The title "Castle" implies that the album is like a castle waiting for fans to explore the treasure, Tsai said: "First, there is a song called "Disappearing Castle" on the album, I think castle is like love, disappearing castle also represents lost love. Meanwhile, my album is like a castle full of treasure, hiding different types of good music. For me, every song on the album is a treasure." The album is based on the concepts of "sky", "earth", and "sea", three themes of visual outfits—"birds in the sky", "white horses in the forest", "blue fish in the deep sea"—reflect the diversity of musical styles of the album, "birds in the sky" represents the album's energetic dance songs, "white horse in the forest" represents the album's exotic fantasy songs, and "blue fish of the deep sea" represents the album's heartbreaking ballads.

Release and promotion 
On February 13, 2004, the album was available for pre-order, and the pre-order gift includes the music video of "Pirates". On February 22, 2004, Tsai held a pre-order promotional event in Taipei, Taiwan, and she announced that the album had been pre-ordered more than 60,000 copies in Taiwan within the first six days. On February 27, 2004, Tsai held a press conference for the release of the album in Taipei, Taiwan. The album peaked at number one on the album sales charts of G-Music and Asia Records in Taiwan. On March 13, 2004, Sony announced that it had sold more than 330,000 copies in China. On April 8, 2004, it was revealed that it had sold more than 200,000 copies in Taiwan. On April 17, 2004, Tsai held the It's Love Concert in Taipei, Taiwan.

On April 30, 2004, Sony released the celebration edition of the album, which additionally includes 10 music videos, and the label announced that the album had sold more than 250,000 copies in Taiwan. On May 14, 2004, the label announced that it had sold more than 1.5 million copies in Asia. On May 24, 2004, it was reported that it had sold more than 450,000 copies in China. On August 4, 2004, it was reported that it topped the album sales chart of Asia Records for nine consecutive weeks. On December 28, 2004, it was revealed that it became the year's highest-selling album by a female artist and the year's second highest-selling album overall in Taiwan. On January 6, 2005, "It's Love" and "36 Tricks of Love" reached number eight and number 78 on the Hit FM Top 100 Singles of the Year chart of 2004.

Live performances 
On April 8, 2004, Tsai participated in the CCTV television show The Same Song and sang "36 Tricks of Love". On April 21, 2004, she participated in the TVBS-G television show Fans Club, where she sang "It's Love" and "The Smell of Lemon Grass". On May 16, 2004, Tsai participated in the recording of Hunan TV television show Happy Camp, where she sang "Pirates", "The Smell of Lemon Grass", and "36 Tricks of Love". On July 6, 2004, she participated in the 2004 Perfect Show Beijing, where she sang "36 Tricks of Love". On July 24, 2004, she participated in the 6th CCTV-MTV Music Awards and sang "36 Tricks of Love". On August 1, 2004, Tsai participated in the 2004 Metro Radio Mandarin Hits Music Awards and sang "Pirates". On August 16, 2004, she participated in the opening party of Qingdao Beer Festival and sang "36 Tricks of Love" and "Rewind".

On September 4, 2004, Tsai participated in the 4th Global Chinese Music Awards and sang "Pirates". On September 24, 2004, she participated in the 5th China Golden Eagle TV Art Festival and sang "36 Tricks of Love" and "Rewind" at the event. On December 17, 2004, Tsai participated in the 2004 TVB8 Mandarin Music On Demand Awards and sang "Pirates". On December 26, 2004, she participated in the 2004 Metro Radio Hits Music Awards and sang "Pirates". On January 11, 2005, Tsai participated in the 11th China Music Awards and sang "Pirates" and "36 Tricks of Love". On February 8, 2005, she participated in the 2005 CCTV Spring Festival Gala, where she sang "36 Tricks of Love". Since then, Tsai has been performing songs from the album at various events.

Music videos 

The music video of 'Pirates' was directed by Marlboro Lai and cost a total of NT$3 million to make. Tsai played both male and female roles in the music video, in addition to wearing a copper necklace and a long Latin dress, she also wore a red turban, held a sword, and wore a medieval pirate captain's suit, and then they used computer technology post-production to show the scene of a man and a woman dancing in pairs. The choreography in the music video is a mix of flamenco and hip-hop. The art design and background were styled after the Middle Ages, with antique and gold ornaments to set up the pirate cabin scene.

The music video of "The Smell of Lemon Grass" was directed by Tony Lin and was filmed at the Yingge Ceramics Museum in Yingge, Taiwan. The music video of "Love Love Love" was co-directed by Marlboro Lai and Bill Chia. The choreography in the video is based on the Mambo dance, but it also incorporated elements of the Broadway style dance from the film, Chicago (2002). The music video of "36 Tricks of Love" was directed by Kuang Sheng, the music video of "It's Love" was directed by Marlboro Lai, and the music video of "Priority" was directed by Tony Lin.

Touring 

On February 27, 2004, Tsai revealed that she would prepare for her first concert tour in the second half of the year. On July 8, 2004, she announced that she would embark on the J1 World Tour at Hongkou Football Stadium in Shanghai, China on August 7, 2004. The tour lasted one year and nine months with eight dates in seven cities and ended on April 22, 2006 at the Bren Events Center in Irvine, United States. On September 23, 2005, Tsai released the live video album J1 Live Concert, which chronicled the tour at Chungshan Soccor Stadium in Taipei, Taiwan on November 20, 2004.

Critical reception 
Tencent Entertainment's Shuwa commented: "Castle is a sequel to Jolin Tsai's Magic, therefore no matter the visual outfits, the musical styles, or even some of the song titles can be found similarly in Magic. The label's continuation of this approach is apparently due to the success of Magic, so they kept it the same and made only small adjustments to continue the success of Castle. They continued to use producers Huang Yi, Jamie Hsueh, Jay Chou, Peter Lee, Bing Wang to create a number of hit songs for Jolin Tsai, it really helped her gain a foothold in Taiwan and even the whole Mandarin music scene."

Sina Entertainment's Deng Wulin commented: "If Magic was a bold attempt, then Castle can be said to continue the quality of its predecessor, it may be because Magic was so new at the time, but Castle is missing a bright surprise." 21hifi stated: "Jolin Tsai's singing skills have been quite good since the debut, they have become quite mature in today. Castle further consolidated Jolin Tsai's success."

Accolades 
On July 24, 2004, Tsai won a CCTV-MTV Music Award for Best Female Singer Taiwan. On August 1, 2004, Tsai won Metro Radio Mandarin Hits Music Awards for Best Female Singer and Best Stage Performance, and "It's Love" won Top Songs. On August 5, 2004, Tsai won an MTV Mandarin Award for Top 20 Singers. On September 4, 2004, Tsai won two Global Chinese Music Awards for Media Recommend Award and Best All-around Artist, and "Pirates" won Top 20 Songs and Best Music Arrangement. On September 10, 2004, Tsai won Singapore Hits Awards for Favorite Female Singer and Favorite Singer (Taiwan). On November 15, 2004, Tsai was nominated an MTV Asia Award for Favorite Artist Taiwan. On December 17, 2004, Tsai won a TVB8 Mandarin Music On Demand Award for Favorite Female Singer, and "Pirates" won Top Songs.

On December 27, 2004, Tsai won Metro Radio Hits Music Awards for Best Female Singer (Mandarin) and Best Asian Female Singer, and "Pirates" won Top Songs (Mandarin). On January 11, 2005, she won a China Music Award for Favorite Female Singer (Hong Kong/Taiwan), and the music video of "Pirates" won Best Music Video (Hong Kong/Taiwan). On January 16, 2005, she won a Hito Music Award for Best Female Singer, and "It's Love" won Top 10 Songs. On March 12, 2005, she won a Music Pioneer Awards for Favorite Female Singer. On March 23, 2005, the album won an IFPI Hong Kong Album Sales Award for Top 10 Selling Albums (Mandarin). On April 7, 2005, Tsai was nominated for an MTV Japan Video Music Award for Best Buzz Asia (Taiwan).

Track listing

Release history

References

External links 
 
 

2004 albums
Jolin Tsai albums
Sony Music Taiwan albums